Steller may refer to any of the following, all named after the  botanist, zoologist, physician, and explorer Georg Wilhelm Steller:

Animals

Steller's eider, a duck
Steller's jay, a bird related to the blue jay
Steller's sea cow, an extinct animal native to the Bering Sea
Steller's sea eagle, a bird of prey native to Russia
Steller sea lion, found in the temperate eastern Pacific
Gumboot chiton, or Cryptochiton stelleri

Other
Steller Secondary School, in Anchorage, Alaska